Closing In is the debut studio album by American heavy metal band Early Man, released on October 11, 2005. There are clear influences from heavy metal bands like Black Sabbath and thrash metal bands like Metallica. Mike Conte's vocal style is very similar to Ozzy Osbourne and Rob Halford, while not exactly imitating them.

The album also features another heavy/speed metal attribute: aggressive, "don't fuck with me" lyrics, as heard on "War Eagle", "Thrill of the Kill", and "Evil Is".

Track listing
Four Walls – 2:42
War Eagle – 3:14
Death Is the Answer – 5:35
Feeding Frenzy – 3:23
Thrill of the Kill – 4:35
Like a Goddamn Rat – 3:10
Fist Shaker – 3:43
Evil Is – 4:27
Brain Sick – 3:32
Contra – 3:53
Raped and Pillaged – 3:51

Critical reception

Closing In received mixed to mostly positive reception.

Pitchfork appreciated the old-school thrash metal style, and the "galloping riffs and booming power chords". The only negative stated was a significant degree of uniformity throughout the album, with only one or two songs varying in style.

AllMusic also appreciated the ferocity of the older style, but heavily criticised both the uniformity but also stated "Closing In is numbingly derivative" with no pieces showing significantly originality.

Personnel
Mike Conte – guitar, bass, vocals
Adam Bennati – drums
Matt Sweeney – producer, additional guitars

References

2005 debut albums
Early Man (band) albums
Matador Records albums